"Don't Be a Baby, Baby" is a song written by Howard Steiner and Buddy Kaye, performed by The Mills Brothers, and released on the Decca label (catalog no. 18753-A). It peaked at No. 3 on Billboard magazine's race records chart and spent eight weeks on that chart. It also reached No. 12 on the pop chart. It was ranked No. 15 on the Billboards year-end list of the most played race records of 1946.

See also
 Billboard Most-Played Race Records of 1946

References

American pop songs
1946 songs